João is the Portuguese equivalent of the given name John.  The diminutive is Joãozinho and the feminine is Joana. It is widespread in Portuguese-speaking countries. Notable people with the name are enumerated in the sections below.

Kings

 João I of Portugal
 João II of Portugal
 João III of Portugal
 João IV of Portugal
 João V of Portugal
 João VI of Portugal
 João I of Kongo, ruled 1470–1509
 João II of Lemba or João Manuel II of Kongo, ruled 1680–1716
 Dharmapala of Kotte, last King of the Kingdom of Kotte, reigned 1551–1597

Princes
 João Manuel, Hereditary Prince of Portugal (1537–1554), son of John III
 Infante João, Duke of Beja (1842–1861)

Arts and literature

 João Bosco, Brazilian musician
 João Cabral de Melo Neto, Brazilian poet and diplomat
 Joao Constancia, Filipino singer, actor and dancer
 João Donato, Brazilian musician
 João de Deus de Nogueira Ramos, Portuguese poet
 João Gilberto, Brazilian musician
 João Guimarães Rosa, Brazilian novelist, short story writer, and diplomat
 João Miguel (actor), Brazilian actor
 João Nogueira, Brazilian musician
 João Pedro Rodrigues, Portuguese film director
 Maria João Pires, Portuguese pianist
 João Simões Lopes Neto, Brazilian writer
 João Ubaldo Ribeiro, Brazilian writer, journalist, and professor
 João Vasco Paiva, Portuguese artist

Sportspeople

Footballers
 João Félix, Portuguese footballer
 João Moutinho, Portuguese footballer
 João Mário (footballer, born January 1993), Portuguese footballer
 João Pereira (disambiguation), several Portuguese footballers
 João Pinto, Portuguese footballer
 João Cancelo, Portuguese footballer
 João Tomás, Portuguese footballer
 Lucas João, Portuguese/Angolan footballer
 Joãozinho (footballer, born 1988), Brazilian footballer
 João Pedro (footballer, born 2001), Brazilian footballer
 João Paulo (footballer, born 1991), Brazilian footballer

Other sportspeople
 João Almeida (cyclist), Portuguese road cyclist
 João Barbosa, Portuguese racing driver
 João Brenha, Portuguese beach volleyball player 
 João Cunha e Silva, Portuguese tennis player 
 João Havelange, Brazilian president of FIFA from 1974–1998
 João José, Portuguese volleyball player 
 João José Pereira, Portuguese triathlete 
 João Sousa, Portuguese tennis player
 João Souza, Brazilian tennis player
 João Souza (fencer), Brazilian fencer

Other people
 João Armando Gonçalves, head of the World Organization of the Scout Movement
 João Biehl, Brazilian anthropologist
 João Rodrigues Cabrilho, 16th-century Portuguese explorer
 João Doria, Brazilian politician
 John of God or João de Deus, Iberian saint
 João Goulart, 27th president of Brazil
 João Gonçalves Zarco, Portuguese navigator, co-discoverer of the Madeira islands
 João Magueijo, Portuguese cosmologist
 João da Nova, 15th-century Portuguese explorer
 João Teixeira de Faria, Brazilian faith healer
 João de Trasto, 15th-century Portuguese explorer
 João Amoêdo, Brazilian engineer and company administrator
 João Lourenço, current President of Angola and previous Minister of Defence

See also
 São João (disambiguation), Portuguese for Saint John
 João and the Knife, a 1972 Dutch-Brazilian film by George Sluizer
 John of Portugal (disambiguation), multiple people

References

Portuguese masculine given names